Trenin may refer to:

Dmitri Trenin, the director of the Carnegie Moscow Center think tank
 Yakov Trenin, Russian ice hockey player
Trenin, a character in a comic book entitled, The First